The president of the European Commission is the head of the European Commission, the executive branch of the European Union (EU). The President of the Commission leads a Cabinet of Commissioners, referred to as the College, collectively accountable to the European Parliament. The President is empowered to allocate portfolios among, reshuffle, or dismiss Commissioners as necessary. The College directs the Commission's civil service, sets the policy agenda and determines the legislative proposals it produces. The Commission is the only body that can propose bills to become EU laws.

The Commission president also represents the EU abroad, together with the President of the European Council and the High Representative of the Union for Foreign Affairs and Security Policy.

The post was established in 1958. Each new President is nominated by the European Council and elected by the European Parliament,  for a five-year term.

The president of the Commission also delivers an annual State of the Union address to the European Parliament.

In July 2019, the European Council nominated Ursula von der Leyen to succeed Jean-Claude Juncker, and she was elected the 13th President of the European Commission by the European Parliament on 16 July. Von der Leyen assumed office on 1 December 2019, following the approval of her nominated College of Commissioners by the European Parliament.

History

Establishment

The present Commission was established by the Treaty of Rome in 1957; it also replaced the High Authority and the Commission of Euratom in 1967. The Commission's first president was Walter Hallstein (see Hallstein Commission) who started consolidating European law and began to impact on national legislation. National governments at first took little heed of his administration, with the president having to stamp the Commission's authority early on. With the aid of the European Court of Justice, the Commission began to be taken more seriously.

In 1965, Hallstein put forward his proposals for the Common Agricultural Policy, which would give the Community its own financial resources while giving more power to the Commission and Parliament and removing the veto power over Agriculture in the Council. These proposals led to an immediate backlash from France. Hallstein knew the proposals would be contentious, and took personal charge of drafting them, over-riding the Agriculture Commissioner. However he did gain the support of Parliament through his proposals to increase its powers, and he also presented his policy to Parliament a week before he submitted them to the Council. He aimed to demonstrate how he thought the Community ought to be run, in the hopes of generating a wave of pro-Europeanism big enough to get past the objections of member states. However, in this it proved that, despite its past successes, Hallstein was overconfident in his risky proposals.

In reaction to Hallstein's proposals and actions, then-French president Charles de Gaulle, who was sceptical of the rising supranational power of the Commission, accused Hallstein of acting as if he were a head of state. France eventually withdrew its representative from the Council, triggering the notorious "empty chair crisis". Although this was resolved under the "Luxembourg compromise", Hallstein became the scapegoat for the crisis. The Council refused to renew his term, despite his being the most 'dynamic' leader until Jacques Delors.

1967–1985
Hallstein's work did position the Commission as a substantial power. The presidents were involved in the major political projects of the day in the 1970s, such as the European Monetary Union. In 1970, President Jean Rey secured the Community's own financial resources, and in 1977, President Roy Jenkins became the first Commission president to attend a G7 summit on behalf of the Community.

However, owing to problems such as the 1973 oil crisis and the 1979 energy crisis, economic hardship reduced the priority of European integration, with only the president trying to keep the idea alive. The member states had the upper hand, and they created the European Council to discuss topical problems, yet the Council was unable to keep the major projects on track such as the Common Agricultural Policy. The Community entered a period of eurosclerosis, owing to economic difficulties and disagreements on the Community budget, and by the time of the Thorn Commission the president was unable to exert his influence to any significant extent.

Presidentialism

However, the Commission began to recover under President Jacques Delors' Commission. He is seen as the most successful president, being credited with having given the Community a sense of direction and dynamism. The International Herald Tribune noted the work of Delors at the end of his second term in 1992: "Mr. Delors rescued the European Community from the doldrums. He arrived when Europessimism was at its worst. Although he was a little-known (outside France) finance minister and former MEP, he breathed life and hope into the EC and into the dispirited Brussels Commission. In his first term, from 1985 to 1988, he rallied Europe to the call of the single market, and when appointed to a second term he began urging Europeans toward the far more ambitious goals of economic, monetary and political union."

But Delors not only turned the Community around, he signalled a change in the Presidency. Before he came to power, the Commission president still was a position of first among equals; when he left office, he was the undisputed icon and leader of the Community. His tenure had produced a strong Presidency and a strong Commission as the president became more important. Following treaties cemented this change, with the president being given control over the allocation of portfolios and being able to force the resignation of Commissioners. When President Romano Prodi took office with the new powers of the Treaty of Amsterdam, he was dubbed by the press as Europe's first Prime Minister. President Delors' work had increased the powers of the Parliament, whose support he had enjoyed. However, later Commissions did not enjoy the same support, and in 1999, the European Parliament used its powers to force the Santer Commission to resign.

Parliamentary oversight

Historically, the Council appointed the Commission president and the whole body by unanimity without input from Parliament. However, with the Treaty on European Union in 1993, the European Parliament, the body elected directly by the citizens of the European Union, gained the right to be consulted on the appointment of the president and to veto the Commission as a whole. Parliament decided to interpret its right to be consulted as a right to veto the president, which the Council reluctantly accepted. This right of veto was formalised in the Amsterdam Treaty. The Treaty of Nice changed the Council's vote from a unanimous choice to one that merely needed a qualified majority. This meant that the weight of the Parliament in the process increased resulting in a quasi-parliamentary system where one group could be in government. This became evident when numerous candidates were put forward in 2004, and a centre-right vote won out over left-wing groups, France and Germany. José Manuel Barroso, elected Commission president that year, was then forced to back down over his choice of Commissioners, owing to Parliament's threat that it would not approve his Commission.

In 2009, the European People's Party (EPP) endorsed Barroso as its candidate for Commission president, and the EPP subsequently retained its position as largest party in that year's election. The Socialists responded by pledging to put forward a rival candidate at future elections. Once again, Barroso was forced by Parliament to make a change to his proposed Commission, but eventually received assent. However, in exchange for approval, Parliament forced some concessions from Barroso in terms of Parliamentary representation at Commission and international meetings. On 7 September 2010, Barroso gave the first US-style State of the Union address to Parliament, which focused primarily on the EU's economic recovery and human rights. The speech was to be annual.

Appointment

Article 17 of the Treaty on European Union, as amended by the Treaty of Lisbon, lays out the procedure for appointing the president and their team. The European Council votes by qualified majority for a nominee for the post of President, taking account of the latest European elections. This proposal is then put before Parliament which must approve or veto the appointment. If an absolute majority of MEPs support the nominee, they are elected. The president then, together with the Council, puts forward their team to the Parliament to be scrutinised. The Parliament normally insists that each one of them appear before the parliamentary committee that corresponds to their prospective portfolio for a public hearing. The Parliament then votes on the Commission as a whole; if approved, the European Council, acting by a qualified majority, appoints the president and their team to office.

Transparency
Qualified majority in the Council has led to more candidates being fielded while there has been greater politicisation due to the involvement of Parliament and the change of policy direction in the EU from the creation of the single market to reform of it. However, despite this, the choice within the Council remains largely behind closed doors. During the appointment of Santer, discussions were kept in camera ("private" from latin "in chamber"), with the media relying on insider leaks. MEPs were angry with the process, against the spirit of consultation that the new EU treaty brought in. Pauline Green MEP, leader of the Socialist group, stated that her group thought "Parliament should refuse to condone a practice which so sullies the democratic process". There were similar deals in 1999 and 2004 saw a repeat of Santer's appointment when Barroso was appointed through a series of secret meetings between leaders with no press releases on the negotiations being released. This was sharply criticised by MEPs such as the ALDE group leader Graham Watson who described the procedure as a "Justus Lipsius carpet market" producing only the "lowest common denominator"; while Green-EFA co-leader Daniel Cohn-Bendit asked Barroso after his first speech "If you are the best candidate, why were you not the first?"

Criteria

The candidate selected by the Council has often been a leading national politician, but this is not a requirement. The choice of President must take into account the result of the latest Parliamentary elections (for example, by choosing the candidate supported by the largest European political party in particular, or at least someone from that political family the Spitzenkandidat principle, below but this is a convention, not an obligation). That provision was not in force in the nomination in 2004, but the centre-right EPP, which won the election, pressured for a candidate from its own ranks. In the end, the EPP candidate, José Manuel Barroso, was chosen. On the same basis, the EPP endorsed again Barroso for a second term during the 2009 European election campaign and, being largest again after that election, was able to secure his nomination by the European Council.

Further criteria seen to be influencing the choice of the Council include: which area of Europe the candidate comes from, favoured as Southern Europe in 2004; the candidate's political influence, credible yet not overpowering members; language, proficiency in French considered necessary by France; and degree of integration, their state being a member of both the eurozone and the Schengen Agreement.

There has been an assumption that there is a rolling agreement along these lines, that a president from a large state is followed by a president from a small state, and one from the political left will be followed by one from the political right: Roy Jenkins (British socialist) was followed by Gaston Thorn (Luxembourgish liberal), Jacques Delors (French socialist), Jacques Santer (Luxembourgish Christian democrat), Romano Prodi (Italian left-wing Christian democrat) and Jose Barroso (Portuguese Christian democrat). However, despite these assumptions, these presidents have usually been chosen during political battles and coalition-building. Delors was chosen following a Franco-British disagreement over Claude Cheysson, Santer was a compromise after Britain vetoed Jean-Luc Dehaene, and Prodi was backed by a coalition of thirteen states against the Franco-German preference for Guy Verhofstadt.

Elections
In February 2008, President Barroso admitted that despite the president having in theory as much legitimacy as heads of governments, in practice it was not the case. The low voter turnout creates a problem for the president's legitimacy, with the lack of a "European political sphere", but analysts claim that if citizens were voting for a list of candidates for the post of President, turn out would be much higher than that seen in recent years.

Under the Treaty of Lisbon the European Council has to take into account the results of the latest European elections and, furthermore, the Parliament elects, rather than simply approve, the Council's proposed candidate. This was taken as the parliament's cue to have its parties run with candidates for the president of the Commission with the candidate of the winning party being proposed by the Council. This was partly put into practice in 2004 when the European Council selected a candidate from the political party which secured a plurality of votes in that year's election. However, at that time only a minor party had run with a specific candidate: the then fourth-placed European Green Party, which had the first true pan-European political party with a common campaign, put forward Daniel Cohn-Bendit and lost even its fourth place in the following election, becoming only the fifth-largest group in 2009 and diminishing its candidate's chances further. However, the victorious EPP only mentioned four or five people as candidates for president.

There have been plans to strengthen the European political parties for them to propose candidates for future elections. The European Liberal Democrat and Reform Party indicated, in its October 2007 congress, its intention to forward a candidate for the post as part of a common campaign but failed to do so. However, the EPP selected Barroso as its candidate and, as the largest party, it was able to ensure his turn was renewed.

The Socialists, disappointed at the 2009 election, agreed to put forward a candidate for Commission President at all subsequent elections. After a campaign within that party to have open primaries for said candidate, the PES Congress gathering in Brussels in November 2011 decided that the PES would designate its candidate for Commission president through primaries taking place in January 2014 in each of its member parties and organisations, before a ratification of the results by an Extraordinary PES Congress in February 2014.

The lead candidate process is the method of linking European Parliament elections by having each major European Political Party nominating their candidate for Commission President prior to the Parliamentary elections. The  of the largest party would then have a mandate to assume the Commission Presidency. This process was first run in 2014, and its legitimacy was contested by the Council.

Background
According to the treaties, the president of the European Commission is nominated by the European Council. Until 2004, this nomination was based on an informal consensus for a common candidate. However, in 2004 the centre-right  EPP  rejected the consensus approach ahead of the European Council meeting, and pushed through its own candidate, Barroso. The approach of national governments was to appoint the various high-profile jobs in EU institutions (European Council president, High Representative and so on) dividing them accordingly along geographic, political and gender lines. This also led to fairly low-profile figures in some cases, for it avoided candidates who had either made enemies of some national governments or who were seen as potentially challenging the Council or certain member states.

Article 17.7
Unease had built up around the secretive power play that was involved in these appointments, leading to a desire for a more democratic process. At the end of 2009, the Treaty of Lisbon entered into force. It amended the appointment of the Commission President in the Treaty on European Union Article 17.7 to add the wording "taking into account the elections to the European Parliament", so that Article 17.7 now included the wording

2014 election
In 2013, in preparation for the European election of 2014, Martin Schulz, then President of the European Parliament campaigned for European political parties to name lead candidates for the post of President of the European Commission; his own party group, the centre-left Party of European Socialists named Schulz as its lead candidate. The EPP held an election Congress in Dublin, where Jean-Claude Juncker beat his rival Michel Barnier and subsequently ran as the  EPP  lead candidate. The European Left Party (GUE/NGL) chose Alexis Tsipras as candidate. The Alliance of Liberals and Democrats for Europe Party and the European Green Party also selected lead candidates.

The EPP won a relative majority (29%) in the 2014 election, and Jean-Claude Juncker, its lead candidate, was nominated by the European Council. British Prime Minister David Cameron and Hungarian Prime Minister Viktor Orbán were the only members of the council to object to his selection.

Criticism
Some commentators argued that this amendment did not entitle the political parties of the Parliament to nominate candidates for the president of the Commission, and that such an interpretation would amount to a "power grab" at the expense of the European Council. The Council found itself taken off guard by how the process took off, and had backed themselves into a corner in having to approve the Parliament's candidate. Following the appointment, leaders vowed to review the process.

On the other hand, it has also been argued that it is still insufficiently democratic and needs to be replaced with a more direct system. Some suggestions toward this have been electing the president via a transnational list, having a direct election, and holding primary elections. Parliamentary proposals to enact some of these in advance of the 2019 election have been opposed by some in the Council.

Term of office
The president is elected for a renewable five-year term starting five months after the elections to the European Parliament. These were brought into alignment via the Maastricht Treaty (prior to which the Commission had a four-year term of office) and the elections take place in June every five years (in years ending in 4 and 9). This alignment has led to a closer relationship between the elections and the president themself with the above-mentioned proposals for political parties running with candidates.

The president and their Commission may be removed from office by a vote of censure from Parliament. Parliament has never done this to date, however the imminence of such a vote in 1999, due to allegations of financial mismanagement, led to the Santer Commission resigning on its own accord, before the Parliamentary vote.

Duties and powers

The president of the European Commission is the most powerful position in the European Union, controlling the Commission which collectively has the right of initiative on Union legislation (only on matters delegated to it by member states for collective action, as determined by the treaties) and is responsible for ensuring its enforcement. The president controls the policy agenda of the Commission for their term and in practice no policy can be proposed without the president's agreement.

The role of the president is to lead the Commission, and give direction to the Commission and the Union as a whole. The treaties state that "the Commission shall work under the political guidance of its president" (Article 219 TEC), this is conducted through their calling and chairing of meetings of the college of Commissioners, their personal cabinet and the meetings of the heads of each commissioner's cabinet (the Hebdo).  The president may also force a Commissioner to resign. The work of the Commission as a body is based on the principle of Cabinet collective responsibility, however in their powers they act as more than a first among equals. The role of the president is similar to that of a national Prime Minister chairing a cabinet.

The president also has responsibility for representing the Commission in the Union and beyond. For example, they are a member of the European Council and takes part in debates in Parliament and the Council of Ministers. Outside the Union they attend the meetings of the G8 to represent the Union. However, in foreign affairs, the president does have to compete with several Commissioners with foreign affairs related portfolios: the High Representative for the Common Foreign and Security Policy and the president of the European Council.

The presidential system had started to develop since Jacques Delors and has since been cemented. However, externally they are still dependent on support from the Council and Parliament. Delors had enjoyed the Parliament's and the Council's support for his whole term, during which, through treaty changes, the Parliament increased in powers and, through the accession of new Member States, the Council increased in membership. The membership is now so large the president is increasingly unable to garner the support of all the states, even though the job is supposed to try to keep everyone happy. The Parliament now has more powers over the Commission and can reject its proposals, although the Commission has little power over Parliament, such as the ability to dissolve it to call new elections.

The president's office is on the top, 13th, floor of the Berlaymont building in Brussels. The president receives their political guidance from their cabinet, the head of which acts as a political bodyguard for the president. Such factors can lead to an isolation of the president from outside events. For the European Civil Service the president has a very high status, due to their immense authority and symbolism within the body. The president exercises further authority through the legal service and Secretariat-General of the Commission. The former has the power to strike down proposals on legal technicalities while the latter organises meetings, agendas and minutes. The president's control over these areas gives them further political tools when directing the work of the Commission. This has also increased the presidential style of the Commission president.

With the reorganisation of leading EU posts under the Lisbon Treaty, there was some criticism of each post's vague responsibilities. Ukrainian ambassador to the EU Andriy Veselovsky praised the framework and clarified it in his own terms: The Commission president speaks as the EU's "government" while the president of the European Council is a "strategist". The High Representative specialises in "bilateral relations" while the European Commissioner for Enlargement and European Neighbourhood Policy deals in technical matters such as the free trade agreement with Ukraine. The president of the European Parliament meanwhile articulates the EU's values.

The MEP and author of several EU text books Richard Corbett has suggested that, instead of every EU institution having a "president", it would have been clearer if they had been named differently, with a "Speaker" of the Parliament, a "Governor" of the Central Bank, a "Chairman" of the (ordinary) Council of Ministers, a "president" of the European Council, and a "Prime Commissioner".

Relationship to the President of the European Council

Despite the presidential style, the president has also lost ground to the larger member states as countries such as France, Italy, the UK and Germany sought to sideline its role. This has increased with the creation of the permanent president of the European Council. There was disagreement and concern over competition between the former president of the European Council Van Rompuy and the former Commission president Barroso due to the vague language of the treaty. Some clarifications saw Van Rompuy as the "strategist" and Barroso as a head of government. In terms of economic planning Van Rompuy saw the Commission as dealing with the content of the plan and the European Council as dealing with the means and implementing it. Despite weekly breakfasts together there was a certain extent of rivalry between the two, as well as with the High Representative. At international summits, both presidents represented the Union, with, in principle, the Commission president speaking on economic questions and the European Council president on political questions, although this division is often hard to maintain in practice.

Although there are concerns that this competition with the European Council president would lead to increased infighting, there are provisions for combining the two offices. The European Council president may not hold a national office, such as a Prime Minister of a member state, but there is no such restraint on European offices. As such, the Commission president, who already sits in the European Council, could also be appointed as its president. This would allow the European Council to combine the position, with its powers, of both executive bodies into a single president of the European Union.

Privileges of office
The basic monthly salary of the president is fixed at 138% of the top civil service grade which, in 2013, amounted to €25,351 per month or €304,212 per year plus an allowance for a residence equal to 15% of salary as well as other allowances including for children's schooling and household expenses.

List of presidents

The European Economic Community was established by the Treaty of Rome, presently known as the Treaty on the Functioning of the European Union; a founding treaty of the union, which explains that the enumeration of presidents which ends with the present position starts with the first president of the Commission of the European Economic Community. The European Union is also the legal successor of the European Economic Community, or the European Community as it was named between 1993 and 2009. The establishment of the European Union in 1993 upon the entry into force of the Maastricht Treaty (formally the Treaty on European Union) did not affect the name of the position.

Upon its entry into force in 2009, the Treaty of Lisbon renamed the Commission of the European Communities the European Commission, reflecting the de facto name as well as the fact that the European Communities pillar was abolished along with the rest of the pillar system.

Groups

Timeline

See also
Vice-President of the European Commission
European Commissioner
List of presidents of EU institutions
President of the European Parliament
President of the European Council
Presidency of the Council of the European Union
President of the European Union

Footnotes

References

Sources

External links
Commission President (official website)
Terms of office
Organisation of the European Commission CVCE (Previously : European NAvigator)
Presidential candidates debate 2014

 
 
Commission, President
1958 establishments in Europe

vi:Danh sách chủ tịch Ủy ban châu Âu